Nohawilliamsia is a genus of flowering plants from the orchid family, Orchidaceae. Only one species is recognized as of June 2014, Nohawilliamsia pirarensis, native to northern South America (Venezuela, Guyana and northern Brazil).

See also 
 List of Orchidaceae genera

References 

 Pridgeon, A.M., Cribb, P.J., Chase, M.A. & Rasmussen, F. eds. (1999). Genera Orchidacearum 1. Oxford Univ. Press.
 Pridgeon, A.M., Cribb, P.J., Chase, M.A. & Rasmussen, F. eds. (2001). Genera Orchidacearum 2. Oxford Univ. Press.
 Pridgeon, A.M., Cribb, P.J., Chase, M.A. & Rasmussen, F. eds. (2003). Genera Orchidacearum 3. Oxford Univ. Press
 Berg Pana, H. 2005. Handbuch der Orchideen-Namen. Dictionary of Orchid Names. Dizionario dei nomi delle orchidee. Ulmer, Stuttgart

External links 
IOSPE orchid photos, Oncidium pirarense 
Colibri Orquideas, Nohawilliamsia pirarensis

Orchids of South America
Monotypic Epidendroideae genera
Cymbidieae genera
Oncidiinae